Francis James Kight (19 September 1905 – 22 March 1983) was an Australian rules footballer who played with Richmond in the Victorian Football League (VFL).

Notes

External links 

1905 births
1983 deaths
Australian rules footballers from Victoria (Australia)
Richmond Football Club players